John Beynon may refer to:
Jackie Beynon (John Alfred Beynon, died 1937), Welsh footballer
Sir John Beynon, 1st Baronet (1864–1944), Welsh industrialist
A pen name of the British novelist John Wyndham (1903–1969)
John Beynon (academic) (born 1939), principal of King's College London (1990–1992)
John H. Beynon (1923–2015), Welsh scientist in the field of mass spectrometry
John Beynon (poet), British poet who won the Eric Gregory Award